Marta Calvo Gómez (born 29 August 1996) is a Spanish taekwondo practitioner who competes in the 62 kg division. She won the silver medal at the 2015 World Taekwondo Championships on the women's lightweight category and later became the vice champion of Europe after she won the silver medal at the 2018 European Taekwondo Championships also in the 62 kg (lightweight) category. Her sister, Eva Calvo, is also a taekwondo competitor who won a silver medal at the 2016 Summer Olympics.

References 

1996 births
Living people
Spanish female taekwondo practitioners
People from Leganés
Sportspeople from the Community of Madrid
Universiade medalists in taekwondo
Mediterranean Games bronze medalists for Spain
Mediterranean Games medalists in taekwondo
Competitors at the 2018 Mediterranean Games
Universiade bronze medalists for Spain
World Taekwondo Championships medalists
European Taekwondo Championships medalists
Medalists at the 2015 Summer Universiade
21st-century Spanish women